Lowe is an unincorporated community in Sussex County, Delaware, United States. Lowe is southeast of Laurel.

References

Unincorporated communities in Sussex County, Delaware
Unincorporated communities in Delaware